Castel Mella (Castelnuovo until 1864; locally ) is a comune in the province of Brescia, in Lombardy.

Geography
It is in the plain southwest of Brescia, on the river Mella. It is bounded by the communes of Brescia, Flero, Capriano del Colle and Roncadelle.

References

Cities and towns in Lombardy